Stroe is a village in the Dutch province of Gelderland. It is located in the municipality of Barneveld, between the towns of Barneveld and Apeldoorn.

Stroe is located on the railway line between these two towns, but the railway station closed in 1944.

History 
It was first mentioned in 1296 as "Wlfumdus de Struode", and means "swamp with overgrowth". In 1840, it was home to 122 people. In 1966, a village house was opened in Stroe. In 1951, the army base Wittenberg was constructed near Stroe. In 1978, it was renamed Major-General Koot Barracks after .

Gallery

References

Populated places in Gelderland
Barneveld (municipality)